Steve Carlyle (born March 10, 1950 in Lacombe, Alberta) is a former professional ice hockey defenceman and current coach.  He was selected in the third round of the 1970 NHL Amateur Draft, 31st overall, by the Montreal Canadiens. , but never played in the NHL.  Carlyle joined the Alberta Oilers for the inaugural 1972–73 WHA season, staying with the renamed Edmonton Oilers until the 1975–76 WHA season.

Prior to being drafted, Carlyle played for the Edmonton Movers and Red Deer Rustlers of the AJHL and for the University of Alberta.  Carlyle played for the Canadian National Team between 1970 and 1972.  He made his WHA debut after being named Edmonton Athlete of the Year in 1972.  On February 2, 1976, Carlyle and Kerry Ketter were traded to the New England Whalers for Paul Hurley and future considerations.  Rather than report, Carlyle retired.

Following his professional career, Carlyle was an assistant coach with the Calgary Oval X-Treme of the Western Women's Hockey League, and is currently the head coach of the women's Chinese National Team.

Carlyle was also the principal of the elementary school in Jasper, Alberta.

Career statistics

External links

Carlyle's biography at HockeyDraftCentral
Carlyle's biography at Home of the Oilers
IIHF article on Chinese woman's team
Jasper Booster article, January 2, 2008

1950 births
Living people
Alberta Golden Bears ice hockey players
Canadian ice hockey defencemen
Edmonton Oilers (WHA) players
Ice hockey people from Alberta
Montreal Canadiens draft picks
People from Lacombe, Alberta
Red Deer Rustlers players